Emanuel Gregers (28 December 1881 – 22 March 1957) was a Danish actor, screenwriter and film director. Gregers made 36 films during a career which extended over four decades from the Danish golden age of silent film until 1949. Critics often dismissed his work as dependable yet uninspired, however many of his light-hearted comedies achieved great popularity in Denmark. Gregers most notable films were romantic comedies starring his wives Bodil Ipsen and Marguerite Viby.

Career 
Emanuel Gregers was born on 28 December 1881 in Horsens, Denmark. At the age of 16 years Gregers debuted at the Horsens summer theater and performed in local theaters for the next 10 years. Around 1909, he moved to Copenhagen and performed in the larger theaters including Norrebros Teater and the Betty Nansen Teatret. Although he quickly shifted to working in film in 1912, Gregers maintained a lifelong attachment to stagework: he owned the Casino theater in Copenhagen and managed it from 1921 to 1931, then continued as a stage director into the 1940s.

Gregers first appeared on film in 1912 with Olaf Fønss in the silent film Bryggerens datter (The Brewer's Daughter) written by Carl Th. Dreyer. The following year he began work with the Filmfabriken studio, where he performed in another Dreyer story Krigskorrespondenter (The War Correspondent), and became the studio's upcoming star.

However, by 1914 Gregers interest had shifted to working behind the camera. He directed himself in a couple of smaller films, then moved to Nordisk Film where he devoted his full attention to writing and directing. In the early 1920s, Gregers directed a series of films that featured his wife Bodil Ipsen. Most notable was the melodramatic crime story Lavinen, in which Greger's employed an elaborate flash-back structure to relate how the lead character's past leads to a murder. It was also at this time that Gregers was part of Nordisk Film's push for larger films based on literary works. In 1920, Greger's filmed Den flyvende Hollænder (The Flying Dutchman) based on the 1839 novel The Phantom Ship and, in 1922, he made Den sidste af Slægten (The Last of the Family Tree) based upon a novel by the later Nazi writer Edvard Nielsen-Stevns. For the later film, Gregers ran into trouble with the Danish censors. In the climatic ending the villain, a depraved artist, falls to his death from scaffolding inside a church. The censors objected and removed the ending.

Gregers directed 36 films in total. The most notable were his folk comedies: the wacky 1937 romantic comedy Mille, Marie of mig (Milly, Maria and Me), in which his then current wife, Marguerite Viby, and the most popular Danish comedienne of the 1930s, played three roles ;  1938's Bolettes brudeafærd (Bolettes Bridal Party), which starred his former wife Bodil Ipsen as a sharp-tongued spinster;  the witty period comedy Sørensen og Rasmussen which starred both his former wives, Viby and Ipsen; and the 1941 backstage musical, Alle gaar rundt og forelsker sig (Everyone's Falling in Love) -- in which a small part was played by Greger's third wife, Ruth Saabye.

Gregers directed his final film in 1949. He died 22 March 1957 at the age of 75.

Personal life 
Gregers was married five times, always to actresses with whom he worked. He was married for the first time in 1907 to Ella Olsen. His second marriage to Bodil Ipsen lasted three years from 1919 to 1923. After divorcing Ipsen, he immediately married Kiss Gregers (born Karen Oda Andersen). His fourth marriage was with the Danish comic actress Marguerite Viby (who was also married five times). Their marriage lasted from 1932 to 1938. His final marriage was to Ruth Egede Saabye who played minor roles in Greger's films in the early 1940s.

Filmography

Director 

Lejlighed til leje (1949)
Den stjaalne minister  (1949)
Man elsker kun en gang  (1945)
Biskoppen  (1944)
Alt for karrieren  (1943)
Lyckan kommer  (1942)
Forellen  (1942)
Thummelumsen  (1941)
En søndag på Amager  (1941)
Alle gaar rundt og forelsker sig  (1941)
En mand af betydning  (1941)
Thorvald Stauning  (1941)
Sørensen og Rasmussen  (1940)
En pige med pep  (1940)
Komtessen paa Steenholt  (1939)
Sketch til Apolloteatret  (1939)
Bolettes brudefærd  (1938)
Milly, Maria och jag  (1938)
Cocktail  (1937)
Mille, Marie og mig  (1937)
Min kone er husar  (1935)
Skaf en sensation  (1934)
Saa til søs  (1933)
Stamherren  (1925)
Solskinsdalen  (1925)
Madsalune  (1923)
Frie fugle  (1922)
Den sidste af slægten  (1922)
Lavinen  (1920)
Den flyvende Hollænder I-IV  (1920)
Krigsmillionæren  (1919)
Lykkens blændværk  (1919)
Zigeunerprinsessen  (1918)
Brændte vinger  (1917)
Hvem er hun?  (1914)

Actor 

Forellen (1942) .... Bankfuldmægtig Carl Møller
Søndag på Amager, En (1941) .... Sangstemme
Odds 777 (1932) .... Godsejer Rosen
Zigeunerprinsessen (1918)
Hvem er hun? (1914)
Pigen fra Hidalgo Fyret (1914) .... Tom, gårdejerens søn
Guldhornene (1914) .... Leif
Krigskorrespondenter (1913)  ... aka The War Correspondent (literal English title)
Bryggerens datter (1912) ... aka The Brewer's Daughter (literal English title)

Writer 

Cocktail (1937) (writer)
Solskinsdalen (1925) (writer)
Frie fugle (1922) (writer)
Lavinen (1920) (writer)
Flyvende Hollænder I-IV, Den (1920) (writer)
 Lykkens blændværk (1919) (writer)
Zigeunerprinsessen (1918) (writer)
Brændte vinger (1917) (writer)
Hvem er hun? (1914) (writer)

References

External links 

Emanuel Gregers at Det Danske Filminstitut

1881 births
1957 deaths
Danish male actors
Danish male film actors
Danish film directors
Danish male screenwriters
Danish male silent film actors
20th-century Danish male actors
People from Horsens
20th-century screenwriters